The 1959 Syracuse Orangemen football team represented Syracuse University in Syracuse, New York during the 1959 NCAA University Division football season. Led by eleventh-year head coach Ben Schwartzwalder, the independent Orangemen were undefeated and won the school's only national championship in football, topping the rankings by wide margins in the final polls in early December.

They met fourth-ranked Texas in the Cotton Bowl Classic in Dallas on New Year's Day, and led 15–0 at halftime and 23–6 after the three quarters. Texas scored midway through the fourth quarter to draw to 23–14, but there was no further scoring, and Syracuse gained its first bowl win. Unranked at the start of the season, Syracuse finished with an 11–0 record with five shutouts, and outscored its opponents 413–73.

Notable players included sophomore running back Ernie Davis, winner of the Heisman Trophy in 1961 and the first selection of the  In the Cotton Bowl Classic, he scored the first two touchdowns and threw a pass to Gerhard Schwedes for the third. Davis was helped by an offensive line that included unanimous first team All-American guard Roger Davis.

The team was named national champion by AP, Billingsley, Boand, DeVold, Football News, Football Research, Football Writers, Helms, Litkenhous, NCF, NFF, Poling,  Sagarin (ELO-Chess), UPI, and Williamson, leading to a consensus national champion designation.

Schedule

Game summaries

Kansas

Maryland

vs. Navy

Holy Cross

West Virginia

at Pittsburgh

at Penn State

Colgate

at Boston University

at UCLA

vs. Texas (Cotton Bowl Classic)

1960 NFL Draft

References

Syracuse
Syracuse Orange football seasons
College football national champions
Lambert-Meadowlands Trophy seasons
Cotton Bowl Classic champion seasons
College football undefeated seasons
Syracuse Orangemen football